Donald Shanks can refer to:
 Donald Shanks (bass-baritone) (1930–2011), Australian operatic bass-baritone
 Don Shanks (stuntman) (born 1950), American actor and stuntman
 Don Shanks (footballer) (born 1952), British footballer
 Donald Shanks (swimmer) (born 1923), a Bermudian swimmer